The Edmonton Bulletin was a newspaper in Edmonton, Alberta, published from 1880 until January 20, 1951.  It was founded by Edmonton pioneer Frank Oliver, a future Liberal politician and cabinet minister in the Canadian Government.

Oliver co-founded the paper with Alex Taylor, the city's first telegraph operator, in 1880.  It was Edmonton's undisputed foremost newspaper until the Edmonton Journal was founded in 1903.  

The Journal took an editorial stance friendly to the Conservative Party, in contrast to the Bulletin which was the Liberal Oliver's mouthpiece.

The Bulletin folded on January 20, 1951.

References

History of the Edmonton Journal
Real Estate Weekly biography of Frank Oliver

Defunct newspapers published in Alberta
History of Edmonton
Newspapers established in 1880
Publications disestablished in 1951
Daily newspapers published in Alberta
Newspapers published in Edmonton
1880 establishments in the Northwest Territories
1951 disestablishments in Alberta